Estella Daniels is an English actress and dancer, best known for her role as Nala in Sinbad.

Career 
Daniels has worked extensively in theatre, performing in Racing Demon (play) at the Crucible Theatre in Sheffield, Iya Ile at the Soho Theatre and Festa at the Young Vic.

In 2011, Sky1 announced that Daniels would play Nala in the television drama Sinbad opposite Elliot Knight and Marama Corlett.

Daniels also appeared in Da Vinci's Demons in 2013, as well as the second season of Death in Paradise.

Personal life 
Prior to filming Sinbad, Daniels could not swim. She took an intensive swimming course to prepare for the role.

Filmography

References

External links 
 
 
 Estella Daniels at Curtis Brown (agency)

English television actresses
Living people
Year of birth missing (living people)
Place of birth missing (living people)
English stage actresses
Black British actresses
English people of Sierra Leonean descent